Kerry Anne Beattie (born 27 September 2002) is a Northern Irish association footballer who plays as a forward for Glasgow City and the Northern Ireland women's national team. She previously played for Women's Premiership club Glentoran.

Club career
Beattie has played for Glentoran in Northern Ireland. She joined the East Belfast club as a 13-year-old from Lisburn Ladies. In January 2022 Glentoran accepted a transfer bid for Beattie from Glasgow City, and she signed a three-and-a-half year professional contract with the Scottish champions. The deal represented the first time a Northern Irish club had ever received a transfer fee for a female player.

International career
Beattie made her senior debut for Northern Ireland on 10 June 2021. She scored her first international goal on 29 November 2021.

Personal life
Beattie's uncle Peter Kennedy was also a footballer.

References

2002 births
Living people
Women's association footballers from Northern Ireland
Women's association football forwards
Glentoran W.F.C. players
Northern Ireland women's international footballers
Glasgow City F.C. players
Scottish Women's Premier League players
Women's Premiership (Northern Ireland) players